The Electoral (Amendment) Act 1990 (No. 36) was a law of Ireland which revised Dáil constituencies in light of the 1986 census. It took effect on the dissolution of the 26th Dáil on 5 November 1992 and a general election for the 27th Dáil on the revised constituencies took place on 25 November 1992.

It adopted recommendations from an independent Commission chaired by Liam Hamilton, President of the High Court, which delivered its report on 31 July 1990.

It repealed the Electoral (Amendment) Act 1983, which had defined constituencies since the 1987 general election.

It was repealed by the Electoral (Amendment) Act 1995, which created a new schedule of constituencies first used at the 1997 general election for the 28th Dáil held on 6 June 1997.



Constituencies

Summary of changes
This list summarises the changes in representation. It does not address revisions to the boundaries of constituencies.
Longford–Westmeath (4) and Roscommon (3) were replaced with Westmeath (3) and Longford–Roscommon (4)
Dublin North was increased from 3 to 4 seats
Dublin Central was reduced from 5 to 4 seats
Dublin South-West was increased from 4 to 5 seats
Dublin South-Central was reduced from 5 to 4 seats
Dublin West was reduced from 5 to 4 seats
Wicklow was increased from 4 to 5 seats

References

Electoral 1990
1990 in Irish law
Acts of the Oireachtas of the 1990s